Portrait of Barthélemy-Jean-Claude Pupil is a 1729 oil painting on canvas by Nicolas de Largillière. It is held at the collection of the Timken Museum of Art, in San Diego

References

External links
 

1729 paintings
Paintings by Nicolas de Largillière
Paintings in the collection of the Timken Museum of Art
Portraits of men